Black Caesar (released theatrically in the UK as Godfather of Harlem) is a 1973 American blaxploitation crime drama film written and directed by Larry Cohen and starring Fred Williamson, Gloria Hendry and Julius Harris. It features a musical score (Black Caesar) by James Brown (with heavy input from his bandleader Fred Wesley), his first experience with writing music for film. A sequel titled Hell Up in Harlem was released in late 1973.

Plot
Tommy Gibbs (Fred Williamson) is an African-American who grew up in Harlem, New York City. As a kid, he was brutally assaulted by a cop named McKinney. The incident led him to a life of crime. As an adult, he joins the New York mafia and becomes the head of a black crime syndicate in Harlem. He wages a gang war with the Italian mobsters of New York City and begins to establish a criminal empire, keeping a ledger book of all his dealings as leverage over his business associates, including McKinney.

He meets and falls in love with a singer named Helen (Gloria Hendry) and marries her. She is unhappy as he is violent and rapes her. Eventually his enemies conspire with her, leading to an attempt on his life that leaves him shot and wounded. Killing his would-be assassins, he returns to his office to retrieve the ledger book. McKinney meets him there and attempts to humiliate him before killing him. Tommy overpowers McKinney and beats him to death. Retrieving the ledger, a badly wounded Tommy returns to the house where he grew up, but a street gang attacks, robs and, presumably, kills him.

Cast
 Fred Williamson as Tommy Gibbs
 Omer Jeffery as Young Tommy Gibbs
 Gloria Hendry as Helen Bradley
 Art Lund as Captain Jack McKinney
 D'Urville Martin as Reverend Rufus
 Julius Harris as Mr. Gibbs
 Minnie Gentry as Mama Gibbs
 Philip Roye as Joe "The Brain" Washington
 Michael Jeffery as Young Joe Washington
 William Wellman Jr. as Alfred Coleman
 James Dixon as "Irish" Bryant
 Val Avery as Cardoza
 Patrick McAllister as Grossfield
 Don Pedro Colley as "Crawdaddy"
 Myrna Hansen as Virginia Coleman

Production
The film script was originally commissioned by Sammy Davis Jr. According to Larry Cohen, Davis "wanted to do a picture in which he was the star, instead of being a flunky to Frank Sinatra and Dean Martin. So I suggested that they do a gangster movie like Little Caesar, since he was a little guy, and so was Jimmy Cagney, and so was Edward G. Robinson. And I thought he could play a little hoodlum working his way up in the Harlem underworld."

Cohen wrote a treatment for $10,000 but when he finished Davis could not pay due to some trouble with the Internal Revenue Service. Then Cohen was approached by Samuel Z. Arkoff of American International Pictures, who were interested in doing an action film that could star a black actor. Cohen produced the treatment he had written for Davis and AIP agreed to finance.

Most of the film was shot in New York although some interiors were filmed in Los Angeles.

Fred Williamson was cast in the lead. Cohen says, "Fred was totally different than what Sammy would have played, because Fred was a handsome leading man. He looked great in the clothes, and he looked great in that hat that I put on him. And he could strut through Harlem, and he looked like the Godfather of Harlem."

Myrna Hansen, who was crowned Miss U.S.A of 1953, was cast by Cohen. They had been neighbors for years when he offered her the role of Virginia Coleman. She would later say that being in that film qualified her for a significant pension increase by the Screen Actors Guild.

Cohen says when he filmed in Harlem the local gangsters threatened to disrupt the shoot unless they were paid off. He offered them small roles in the film instead. "These guys were great," he said. "Anything we wanted, anything we needed to get, they got for me. We kind of owned Harlem after that. And then when the picture finally opened, I put them in the poster too, so that the advertisements in the paper had these guys in it. And opening day at the Cinerama Theater on Broadway, these gangsters were down there in front of the theater signing autographs."

The Harlem film sequence was directed by James Signorelli, later to go on to producing films on Saturday Night Live.

Release and reception
The original cut of the film ended with Tommy Gibbs being beaten, robbed and killed by a black street gang, but this scene was removed from general release, appearing only in European releases of the film, until it was restored for home video release, and is now generally accepted as the official ending of the film.

Cohen says "The picture did so well that they called me immediately and said, “You’d better get a sequel going before these actors decide they want an enormous amount of money to reappear.” So I said, “You know I don’t have a script, but I can start shooting something, and make it up as I go along.” That’s more or less what we did." The result was Hell Up in Harlem. The sequel contradicts the film's original ending, and so the two films appear to lack continuity when viewed back-to-back on home video, as Gibbs is still alive in Hell Up in Harlem, despite dying in Black Caesar.

In 2001, it was released on DVD, featuring an audio commentary by director Larry Cohen. In 2010 it was digitized in High Definition (1080i) and broadcast on MGM HD. In 2015, Olive Films released the film on Blu-ray.

Critical reception
In 2009 Empire named it 18th in a poll of the "20 Greatest Gangster Movies You've Never Seen* (*Probably)".

Legacy
Prominent rappers have sampled James Brown's score. "The Boss", which is the background music for a scene in which Tommy Gibbs is shot while crossing a street corner, was sampled for Ice-T's "You Played Yourself", Trick Daddy's "Take It To Da House"), Prodigy's album Return of the Mac and Nas' "Get Down" on the album God's Son.

The film is name-checked in Public Enemy's song "Burn Hollywood Burn"; when the cinema announces the movie to be Driving Miss Daisy, guest rapper Big Daddy Kane suggests leaving, saying "I got Black Caesar back at the crib." Kane makes another reference to the movie in his song "How U Get A Record Deal". Kool Keith references the main character in the song "Keith Turbo" from Black Elvis/Lost in Space: "Take off your shirt; I can see your ribs; Fakin' like Tommy Gibbs."

See also
 List of American films of 1973
 List of blaxploitation films

References

External links
 
 Black Caesar at Blaxploitation.com
 

1973 films
American International Pictures films
Blaxploitation films
1973 crime drama films
Remakes of American films
Films set in Harlem
Films set in New York City
American independent films
Films about African-American organized crime
Films about the American Mafia
Films directed by Larry Cohen
American crime drama films
Films with screenplays by Larry Cohen
1970s English-language films
1973 independent films
1970s American films